The Reserve of the Supreme High Command  (Russian: Резерв Верховного Главнокомандования; also known as the Stavka Reserve or RVGK) comprises  reserve military formations and units; the Stavka Reserve acted as the principal military reserve of the Soviet Red Army during World War II, and the RVGK now operate as part of the Russian Armed Forces under the control of the Supreme Commander-in-Chief of the Russian Armed Forces - the  President of the Russian Federation.

History

World War II 
Forces from the Reserve were assigned by the Stavka (Supreme High Command) to individual fronts (army groups) that were conducting major operations. These formations were designed to support any forms of operations but especially penetrations and exploitations in accordance with the Soviet deep battle doctrine.

Beginning in 1943, the formations and units in the Reserve ranged from battalions to whole armies (e.g. the Reserve Armies), with an emphasis on artillery and mechanised formations, and were capable of large-scale, independent operations. For example, as of April 1943, an artillery penetration corps contained as many as 1,500 gun tubes and rocket launchers each. Tank armies, which also emerged in 1943, included one or two tank corps and one mechanised corps, plus supporting units. These mechanised formations were capable of conducting operational exploitations of up to 500 kilometers.

Modern period
Most of the military units of the Airborne Forces, which are part of the Reserve of the Supreme Commander-in-Chief, are also guards. With reference to the Russian airborne troops, as the reserve of the Supreme Commander, officially used two largely equivalent term: reserves and fund - the latter reflects an instrumental status of forces among a set of other measures of military and non-military nature for the implementation of state power at the disposal of the supreme leader of the country. 

The airborne troops have always been the reserve of the Supreme Commander-in-Chief. The most important, but not the only factor that makes the Airborne being a reserve force of the Supreme Commander, is their mobility - to ensure the defense of the territory of such a large scale country as Russia, is only possible with the use of airborne compounds, which at any time could be parachuted to any theater of operations. To accomplish this task, the Airborne Forces are the most suitable, which de facto fulfill the function of rapid reaction forces.

See also
 Reserve Front

Citations

References

Further reading
Dunn, Stalin's Keys to Victory

Military units and formations of the Soviet Union in World War II
Army units and formations of Russia